is a Japanese series of web anime shorts that first aired September 27, 2016, provided by the Docomo Anime Store service. Other than the short series, a manga series, a novel series and other projects are being considered in development. A second season premiered in 2018. A sequel film, titled Kaiju Girls (Black), was released on November 23, 2018.

Synopsis
It has been years since the battle between the human race and the monsters has ended, and a new era of peace has started. In the present day, girls who contain the souls of past monsters have appeared and possess the ability to summon their inner monster forms, called . An organization called GIRLS has formed to collect them. The story focuses on the GIRLS rookie members, Agira, Miclas and Windom in their misadventures.

Characters

GIRLS
The main characters in this series are composed of three rookie members of GIRLS. All of them are 16 years old and based on Ultraseven's Capsule Monsters.

/

The main viewpoint character, who is timid among the trio. According to the director Minoru, she is chosen as the main character due to finding her situation of being "sandwiched" in-between energetic and calm characters quite interesting. She is the last to transform into her Kaiju form, which acquired while saving a kindergartener from a car.

/

She is the first to acquire her Kaiju form due to her admiration for Red King.

/

A no-nonsense person, who in reality is a yaoi fangirl. She acquired her Kaiju form when reading a yaoi manga.

Other characters

A mysterious woman who is actually the champion of Great Monster Fight matches and is GIRLS' strongest cadet. She views Agira being similar to her past.

GIRLS' main idol, who introduced the Soulrizer that would allow girls with the spirit of an Ultra Kaiju to transform.

One of the strongest fighters in the Great Monster Fight. Despite her strength, she also has an affinity for cute things. She usually hunts for Kaiju Girls that went on a rampage from the effects of transforming without the use of Soulrizer.

A yaoi fangirl who is adored by Windom. The original monster's tail was located on her right arm, which she uses as a whip.

/

A friendly person who, despite living in Osaka, talks in a Kansai accent. She is also a contestant of Great Monster Fight but was defeated by Red King in a match.

A rebellious middle school student who frequently runs away from home due to an argument with her mother, resulted in the acquirement of her monster form. But due to the lack of a Soulriser, she becomes a rampaging monster until Red King manages to neutralize the situation.

A mysterious character in Agira's consciousness whose voice call, "I'm counting on you, Agira!" gives her the courage that eventually leads to her acquirement of her monster form. He is theorized to be Dan Moroboshi, Agira's (and by extent, Miclas and Windom's) owner during his show, Ultra Seven.

Media

Anime
The anime was first announced on March 25, 2016, with the promotional video aired at the AnimeJapan event at Tokyo Big Sight, originally under the title . Riho and Yurika are set to be the guest of honors in the annual Ultraman Festival 2016 on July 24.

Three voice actors for the series' main casts were unveiled on June 30, 2016 as Riho Iida, Aina Suzuki and Yurika Endō, who would as well perform the series' theme song. The staff is accepting suggestions for the trio's group name until July 15. On September 27, Crunchyroll announced that they had acquired the rights to simulcast the series except in Asia.

Game
Kaiju Girls once collaborated with the mobile game Monmusu Harem which, similar to the Ultra Monster Anthropomorphic Plan, features more anthropomorphism of monsters. The cast of Kaiju Girls are featured as extra characters and all of them are reprised by their original voice actors.

References

External links
Official Website

2016 anime ONAs
2018 anime ONAs
Moe anthropomorphism
Studio Puyukai
Ultra Series
Yumeta Company